Arecaidine is a bio-active alkaloid in areca nuts. It is a competitive GABA uptake inhibitor. Lime is said to hydrolyse arecoline to arecaidine

References 

Piperidine alkaloids
Carboxylic acids
GABA reuptake inhibitors